New York's 60th State Assembly district is one of the 150 districts in the New York State Assembly. It has been represented by Democrat Nikki Lucas since a special election in 2022.

Geography
District 60 is in Brooklyn, and consists of the neighborhoods of East New York, Starrett City, the Hole and a portion of Brownsville. Shirley Chisholm State Park is also located within the district.

2000s 
District 60 consisted of a portion of Bay Ridge in Brooklyn and the eastern shore of Staten Island. Following redistricting in 2011, this became the 64th district.

Recent election results

2022

2022 special

2020

2018

2016

2014

2012

References

60
Politics of Brooklyn